Fietsen naar de Maan  is a 1963 Dutch film directed by  Jef van der Heyden.

It was the first movie to star Jeroen Krabbé.

The storyline concerns three brothers who have problems dealing with their father's heritage.

Cast
  - Dick Egmond
  - Evert Egmond
 Bernhard Droog - Henk Egmond
  - Joost
  - Wilma

External links 
 

1963 films
Dutch black-and-white films
1960s Dutch-language films